is a multidirectional shooter arcade video game developed and published by Namco in 1981. It was released by Rock-Ola in North America as Warp Warp. The game was ported to the Sord M5 and MSX. A sequel, Warpman, was released in 1985 for the Family Computer with additional enemy types, power-ups, and improved graphics and sound.

Gameplay

The player must take control of a "Monster Fighter", who must shoot tongue-sticking aliens named "Berobero" (a Japanese onomatopoeic word for licking) in the "Space World" without letting them touch him. If he kills three Berobero of the same colour in a row, a mysterious alien will appear that can be killed for extra points. When the Warp Zone in the centre of the screen flashes (with the Katakana text  in the Japanese version or the English text "WARP" in the US versions), it is possible for the Monster Fighter to warp to the "Maze World", where the Berobero must be killed with time-delay bombs. The delay is controlled by how long the player holds the button down - but every time he kills one, his bombs will get stronger, making it easier for the Monster Fighter to blow himself up with his own bombs until he returns to Space World.

Reception

In a retrospsective review, AllGame compared its gameplay to Wizard of Wor and Bomberman, describing it as "an obscure but endearing maze shooter".

References

External links

1981 video games
Arcade video games
Namco arcade games
Bandai Namco Entertainment franchises
Multidirectional shooters
MSX games
Nintendo Entertainment System games
Video games developed in Japan